Buki Akib is a British actress and fashion designer. She was born in Lagos, Nigeria. Trained at the Italia Conti Academy of Theatre Arts, she portrayed Josie Jump in the television children's programme Balamory between 2002 and 2004.

Since 2010, Akib has owned her own fashion label. Her work has appeared in magazines and featured in exhibitions in London and New York.

References

External links

Buki Akib at Instagram

English television actresses
Living people
20th-century English actresses
21st-century English actresses
Year of birth missing (living people)
People from Lagos